Seyyedabad (also Romanized as Seyyedābād; also known as Sa‘īdābād) is a village in Soltanabad Rural District, in the Central District of Khoshab County, Razavi Khorasan Province, Iran. At the 2006 census, its population was 1,463, in 390 families.

References 

Populated places in Khoshab County